Little Meadows is a borough in Susquehanna County, Pennsylvania, United States. The population was 247 at the 2020 census.

Geography
Little Meadows is located at  (41.990869, -76.133521).

Demographics

As of the census of 2010, there were 273 people, 119 households, and 76 families residing in the borough. The population density was 113.8 people per square mile (44.4/km2). There were 134 housing units at an average density of 55.8 per square mile (21.8/km2). The racial makeup of the borough was 99.2% White, 0.4% Asian, and 0.4% from two or more races. Hispanic or Latino of any race were 1.5% of the population.

There were 119 households, out of which 18.5% had children under the age of 18 living with them, 54.6% were married couples living together, 6.7% had a female householder with no husband present, and 36.1% were non-families. 29.4% of all households were made up of individuals, and 11% had someone living alone who was 65 years of age or older. The average household size was 2.29 and the average family size was 2.76.

In the borough the population was spread out, with 16.1% under the age of 18, 60.1% from 18 to 64, and 23.8% who were 65 years of age or older. The median age was 52.3 years.

The median income for a household in the borough was $48,235, and the median income for a family was $85,156. Males had a median income of $40,833 versus $25,909 for females. The per capita income for the borough was $26,027. About 9.4% of families and 14.6% of the population were below the poverty line, including 21.9% of those under the age of eighteen and 4.5% of those 65 or over.

References

External links

Boroughs in Susquehanna County, Pennsylvania
Populated places established in 1800
1859 establishments in Pennsylvania